MS Transpet was a tanker of United States and Panamanian registry. Laid down as MV Avoca and acquired by the Maritime Commission (MARCOM) on a loan charter basis and renamed USS Petaluma (AOG-69), she was to be a type T1  built for the US Navy during World War II. She was named after the Petaluma River, in California. Petaluma (AOG-69) was never commissioned into the US Navy.

Construction
Petaluma (AOG-69) was laid down on 14 February 1945, under a Maritime Commission (MARCOM) contract, MC hull 2629, by the St. Johns River Shipbuilding Company, Jacksonville, Florida; acquisition by the US Navy was cancelled 26 August 1945.

Petaluma was launched on 5 May 1945, and was about 85% complete when, due to the end of World War II, the ship's US Navy reassignment was canceled. Although initially restored to her original name of Avoca by her original owners, the unfinished ship was completed by the Maryland Drydock Company in Baltimore, Maryland, in October 1947, and sold to the National Petroleum Transport Corporation where she was renamed Transpet.

Career
From 1947 until 1951, Transpet flew the US flag. In 1951 Transpet was registered under the Panamanian flag and placed under the operation of D.K. Ludwig of New York for the British-American Oil Company.

The following day, the ship suffered an explosion in the engine room while in the Gulf of St. Lawrence. Two seamen were killed in the blast; the other eighteen members of the crew abandoned the sinking ship and were rescued by the British ship Ottinge and landed at North Sydney, Nova Scotia.

It was the first time the "sea scanar", which had been in use as a fish finder off the West Coast of the United States, had been used in a salvage operation and the first wreck located using it.

References

Bibliography

External links 

 

Type T1-M-BT1 tankers
Klickitat-class gasoline tankers
Ships built in Jacksonville, Florida
Ships built in Baltimore
1945 ships
Merchant ships of the United States
Merchant ships of Panama
Shipwrecks in the Gulf of Saint Lawrence
Shipwrecks of the New Brunswick coast
Maritime incidents in 1951